Brian Wilson (born 30 September 1961) is a former Australian rules footballer in the Victorian Football League (VFL).

Early in his career, he played in the centre and later became a forward pocket. At Melbourne he developed into an aggressive player, winning possessions in packs and showed great handballing skills.

Believed to be the only player to have won a Brownlow Medal at his third club. At 20 years of age, he was also the youngest winner since Bob Skilton in 1959.

External links
Biography at the Melbourne Football Club website

1961 births
Living people
Western Bulldogs players
Melbourne Football Club players
North Melbourne Football Club players
St Kilda Football Club players
Brownlow Medal winners
Australian rules footballers from Victoria (Australia)
Braybrook Football Club players
Victorian State of Origin players